Mogurnda mogurnda, commonly known as  the northern trout gudgeon or northern purple-spotted gudgeon is a freshwater fish native to northern Australia and New Guinea.

References

northern trout gudgeon
Freshwater fish of New Guinea
Freshwater fish of Australia
northern trout gudgeon